The men's 5000 metres at the 2019 World Para Athletics Championships was held in Dubai on 13 November (T54) and 14 November 2019 (T11 and T13).

Medalists

Detailed results

T11 

The event was held on 14 November.

T13 

The event was held on 14 November.

T54 

The event was held on 13 November.

See also 
List of IPC world records in athletics

References 

5000 metres
2019 in men's athletics
5000 metres at the World Para Athletics Championships